The Alishan National Scenic Area is a mountain resort and nature reserve located in Alishan township, Chiayi County, Taiwan.

Geography

Notable characteristics include mountain wilderness, four villages, waterfalls, high altitude tea plantations, the Alishan Forest Railway, and a number of hiking trails. The area is popular with tourists and mountain climbers. Alishan, itself has become one of the major landmarks associated with Taiwan. The area is famous for its production of high mountain tea and wasabi.

Alishan is well known for its sunrises, sunset, sea of clouds in the area between Alishan and Yüshan, railway station, and sacred trees. Alishan, along with Taroko Gorge and Sun Moon Lake, is one of Taiwan's most popular scenic attractions.

Climate
Alishan National Scenic Area spans a broad range in altitude. Lower elevations, such as in Leye Township, share the same subtropical and tropical climate as the rest of southern Taiwan, while the climate changes to temperate and alpine as the elevation increases. Snow sometimes falls at higher elevations in the winter. Alishan is located at an altitude of 1400 to 2600 meters. The average annual temperature is about 10 degrees Celsius, coupled with abundant rainfall.  

Average temperatures are moderate:
 Low elevations: 24 °C in the summer, 16 °C in the winter.
 Medium elevations: 19 °C in the summer, 12 °C in the winter. 
 High elevations: 14 °C in the summer, 5 °C in the winter.

Topography
Alishan is mountainous:

Number of peaks above 2000 meters: 25
Highest point: Da Ta Shan (大塔山), 2,663 meters.
Average height of Alishan Mountain Range: 2,500 meters.

Vegetation and wildlife
Important trees in the area include:
Taiwania cryptomerioides, a large coniferous tree in the cypress family Cupressaceae (the same family as the next three species)
Chamaecyparis formosensis, or Formosan Cypress
Chamaecyparis taiwanensis
Cunninghamia konishii
Pinus taiwanensis, or Taiwan Red Pine
Picea morrisonicola, or Yüshan Spruce
Pseudotsuga sinensis var. wilsoniana, or Taiwan Douglas-fir
Abies kawakamii, a species of conifer in the family Pinaceae, only found in Taiwan
Tsuga chinensis var. formosana, Taiwan or Chinese Hemlock
Ulmus uyematsui, a species of elm only found in the Alishan region

Sacred Trees 
In 1906, the Japanese has discovered a red cypress tree that was over 3000 years old, located next to the Alishan Forest Railway's Sacred Tree Station. The Japanese honored it as the "Sacred Tree".

The Alishan sacred tree withered due to lightning and heavy rain. It was put down in 1998 for tourists to visit. In 2006, the Chiayi County Government and the Alishan Scenic Area Administration started a voting activity to select other sacred trees as the new landmark in the scenic area.

The Giant trees are later organized and a trail is built for visitors to enter, where they can see more than 38 giant trees, most of which are hundreds of years old.

History

The Alishan area was originally settled by the Tsou tribe of the Taiwanese aborigines; the name derives from the aboriginal word Jarissang. Ethnic Han Chinese settlers first settled on the plains near modern-day Chiayi as early as the late Ming Dynasty (around the mid-17th century), but did not move into the mountains until the late 18th century, establishing the towns of Ruili, Ruifeng, Xiding, and Fenqihu. The resulting armed clashes between the settlers and the aborigines pushed the aborigines even further into the mountains.

This led to the development of the logging industry in the area and the export of local cypress and Taiwania wood. A series of narrow-gauge railways were built in the area during this time to facilitate the transportation of lumber from the mountains to the plains below, part of which continues to operate as the Alishan Forest Railway. Several new villages also began to sprout up along the railway lines. It was also during this time that the first tourists began to visit the area. Plans were even drawn up to incorporate the area into the new Niitaka (New Highest) Arisan National Park (新高阿里山国立公園).

With the exhaustion of forest resources by the 1970s, domestic and international tourism overtook logging to become the primary economic activity in the area. The tourism industry continued to expand with the completion of the Alishan highway in the 1980s, displacing the railroad as the primary mode of transportation up the mountain. To combat the problems associated with the growing crowds of tourists and the expanding high mountain tea and wasabi plantations, the area was declared a national scenic area in 2001. The area covers the Alishan Forest Recreation Area and the Han Chinese villages of Ruili, Fengshan, and Taihe, as well as the Tsou people of Dabang, Shanmei, and Chashan, and the administrative area spans four townships, including Meishan Township, Zhuqi Township, Fanlu Township, and Alishan Township.

On 1 December 2014, fire broke out at Alishan spreading over more than 5 hectares of land. The area affected was located near Tapang No. 3 Bridge. The fire was believed to happen due to dry ground which was vulnerable to fire because of the absence of rain in the area for months.

Tourists 
In October 2014, The Chiayi Forestry Administration pointed out that the park's facilities have been improved to create an aesthetic forest atmosphere, and the Alishan Highway is relatively undamaged, which in turn has improved the quality of recreation, attracting more than 2.08 million visitors to Alishan this year.

In order to provide a more comfortable recreation experience for visitors, the Chiayi Forestry Administration has completed reconstructions such as the separation of pedestrian and vehicular roads, the improvement of facilities at the Visitor Service Center, and the constructions of the landscape around the Alishan sacred tree, etc. The successful project has a positive force for the peaking tourists numbers in 2014.

Since August 2019, China has imposed a ban on the free flow of Chinese visitors and subsequently increased the number of tour groups, which has impacted the entire tourism industry in Taiwan. The number of visitors decreased by 49.8%, and the number of Chinese visitors also decreased from 1.76 million in 2014 to 420,000, a big drop of 76%. From 2017 to 2019, there will be 1,093,896, 952,418, and 900,1441 national visitors, 594,158, 428,884, and 419,712 Chinese tourists, and 60,292, 63,744, and 65,481 foreign visitors, respectively. The number of foreign visitors has increased by 8.6%.

The Chiayi Forestry Administration Office stated that tourists numbers was affected by the Covid-19 epidemic in 2020. There were only 99,7052 tourists, the lowest in 10 years, compared with the highest number of tourists which is 2.76 million in 2014. Through the outbreak of Covid-19 in May 2021, Alishan National Scenic Area has announced it closure under the tier three Covid restriction.

Attractions and landmarks
Fenqihu is a small town of low wooden buildings built into the mountainside at 1,400 meters, midpoint of the Alishan Forest Railway. It is famous for natural rock formations, mountain streams, forests, and the ruins of a Shinto temple in the vicinity, as well as for its production of high altitude food products such as bamboo shoots and aiyu jelly. The local box lunches (Fenqihu bento) are known across Taiwan and are sold from stalls at the train station and from Fenqihu Hotel on the Fenqihu Old Street. Fenqihu is currently the terminal end of the Alishan Forest Railway line from Chiayi to Alishan, since the railway was heavily damaged by Typhoon Morakot in 2009 and only the Chiayi to Fenqihu portion was reopened in 2014.

See also
 National parks of Taiwan
 Alishan Range
 List of tourist attractions in Taiwan

References

External links

Alishan Township Office
Alishan National Scenic Area Official Website 

National scenic areas of Taiwan
Geography of Chiayi County
Tourist attractions in Chiayi County